The 2016–17 Wessex Football League season (known as the Sydenhams Football League (Wessex) for sponsorship reasons) was the 31st in the history of the Wessex Football League since its establishment in 1986.

The league consisted of two divisions: the Premier Division and Division One. The constitution was announced on 12 May 2016.

Premier Division
The Premier Division was increased from 21 teams to 22 after Salisbury were promoted to the Southern League, and Folland Sports were relegated to Division One.

Three teams joined the division:
Amesbury Town, runners-up in Division One.
Bashley, relegated from Southern League Division One South & West.
Portland United, champions of Division One.

AFC Portchester, Blackfield & Langley and Moneyfields have applied for promotion to Step 4 for 2017–18.

League table

Division One
Division One was increased from 18 teams to 21 after Amesbury Town and Portland United were promoted to the Premier Division.

Five clubs joined the division:
Baffins Milton Rovers, promoted from the Hampshire Premier League.
Folland Sports, relegated from the Premier Division.
Hamble Club, promoted from the Hampshire Premier League, rejoining after leaving in 2007.
Shaftesbury, promoted from the Dorset Premier League, rejoining after leaving in 2011.
Weymouth Reserves, promoted from the Dorset Premier League.

Alton Town F.C. was renamed Alton F.C.

Reserve sides are not eligible for promotion to Step 5.

League table

References

External links
 Wessex Football League official site

Wessex Football League seasons
9